Maietta is a genus of crane fly in the family Limoniidae.

Distribution
Chile.

Species
M. squamigera Alexander, 1929
M. trimedia Alexander, 1967

References

Limoniidae
Nematocera genera
Diptera of South America
Endemic fauna of Chile